2013 was a successful year for the Chiefs rugby team winning 12 of their Super rugby games to top the table and then went on to beat Crusaders in the Semi-final and Brumbies in the final. The Chiefs also became the New Zealand Conference winners and take out the BNZ Cup

Standings

The final standings of the 2013 Super Rugby season were:

Results

The results of the Chiefs during the 2013 Super Rugby season were:

Squad

The Chiefs squad for the 2013 Super Rugby season were:

Player statistics

The Chiefs players' appearance and scoring statistics for the 2013 Super Rugby season are:

Notes and references

External links
Official Chiefs website
Official Super Rugby website
Official Facebook page

2013
2013 in New Zealand rugby union
2013 Super Rugby season by team